Sybota is a genus of uloborid spiders, found in Chile and Argentina.

Species 
 it contains six species:
 Sybota abdominalis (Nicolet, 1849) – Chile
 Sybota atlantica Grismado, 2001 – Argentina
 Sybota compagnuccii Grismado, 2007 – Argentina
 Sybota mendozae Opell, 1979 – Argentina
 Sybota osornis Opell, 1979 – Chile
 Sybota rana (Mello-Leitão, 1941) (type) – Argentina

See also 
 List of Uloboridae species

References 

Uloboridae
Araneomorphae genera
Spiders of South America